The Café Budapest Contemporary Arts Festival, formerly the Budapest Autumn Festival (Hungarian Budapesti Őszi Fesztivál) is an annual dance, jazz, theatre, poetry and fine arts festival founded in Budapest in 1992. The festival usually takes place in early October.

Like the Budapest Spring Festival, the Autumn Festival is also sponsored by the city, but the content is more geared to modern and avant-garde arts.

The festival overlaps with the classical Budapest Music Weeks in late September to early November.

References

External links
 Café Budapest Contemporary Arts Festival website 

1992 establishments in Hungary
Festivals established in 1992
Events in Budapest
Festivals in Hungary
Arts festivals in Hungary
Autumn events in Hungary